Georgia's 106th House District elects one member of the Georgia House of Representatives. 
Its current representative for the 2021–22 session is Rebecca Mitchell.

Elected representatives

References

Georgia House of Representatives districts